Seckin Getbay (born 27 January 1989) is a Turkish footballer who plays for Menemenspor.

External links
 Gençlerbirliği Site Profile
 
 Profile at TFF.org

1989 births
People from Altındağ, Ankara
Footballers from Ankara
Living people
Turkish footballers
Turkey under-21 international footballers
Turkey youth international footballers
Association football midfielders
Hacettepe S.K. footballers
Gençlerbirliği S.K. footballers
Fethiyespor footballers
Giresunspor footballers
Ünyespor footballers
Yeni Malatyaspor footballers
Gaziosmanpaşaspor footballers
Aydınspor footballers
Göztepe S.K. footballers
Sarıyer S.K. footballers
Niğde Anadolu FK footballers
Ankara Keçiörengücü S.K. footballers
Uşakspor footballers
Menemenspor footballers
TFF First League players
TFF Second League players
TFF Third League players